Muhammad Khaled Khashoggi (1889–1978), also spelled as Mohamed Khaled Khashoggi, was a Saudi medical doctor. He was King Abdulaziz Al Saud's personal doctor.

Personal life
Khashoggi's remote Turkish ancestors made the Hajj from Kayseri to Mecca some four centuries earlier and decided to stay. Their family surname means "spoon maker" (kaşıkçı) in Turkish. He was married to Samiha Ahmed (Setti) and had six children, Adnan Khashoggi, Samira Khashoggi, Essam Khashoggi, Adil Khashoggi, Assia Khashoggi, and Soheir Khashoggi. His grandchildren include Dodi Fayed, Jamal Khashoggi, Emad Khashoggi, and Nabila Khashoggi.

Biography
Khashoggi emigrated from Medina along with his family and brother Abdullah Khashoggi, who was working as a Muhtasib, during the Siege of Medina in 1918 whereupon they settled in Damascus. Later on, he studied medicine in Damascus and became a surgeon.  He then went to Paris to study radiation therapy, then to Mecca to open his private clinic.

He moved to Riyadh to work at the Ministry of Health where he brought in Egyptian doctors to work in Saudi Arabia. In the 1970s, he went to live in Beirut, Lebanon, but left shortly afterwards for London in 1974 after the emergence of the Lebanese Civil War. Eventually, he went back to Riyadh where he died while undergoing surgery. He was buried in Medina.

References

1889 births
1978 deaths
Saudi Arabian surgeons
Saudi Arabian people of Turkish descent
Muhammad
20th-century Saudi Arabian physicians